Pecanex homolog 3 is a protein that in humans is encoded by the PCNX3 gene.

References

Further reading